Thomas Edwin Jago (21 July 1925 – 12 October 2018) was a Cornish liquor executive and marketeer known as the creator of Baileys Irish Cream, Malibu (flavoured rum) and Johnnie Walker Blue Label.

During his semi-retirement, he co-founded The Last Drop Distillers with other industry veterans and his daughter in 2008 that specialises in rare and unique spirits.

Biography
Jago was born on 21 July 1925 in the town of Camelford, Cornwall, United Kingdom, the son of Thomas Bennett Jago, who managed the local Barclays bank, and his mother Violet. He went to Camelford Grammar School before studying history at Christ Church, Oxford. Jago served as a lieutenant on the destroyer HMS Wolfhound in the North Atlantic during World War II. After the war he returned to Oxford and completed his degree.

In 1952, Jago married Penelope Vaughan-Morgan (1926-2018), a granddaughter of Kenyon Vaughan-Morgan, and niece of John Vaughan-Morgan, Baron Reigate. The couple had four children together; Barnaby, Rebecca, Daniel, and Francis.

References

1925 births
2018 deaths
People from Camelford
Alumni of Christ Church, Oxford